There are two species of skink named copper-tailed skink:

 Ctenotus taeniolatus, found in Australia
 Emoia cyanura, found in Borneo and South Pacific islands